A carbon print is a photographic print with an image consisting of pigmented gelatin, rather than of silver or other metallic particles suspended in a uniform layer of gelatin, as in typical black-and-white prints, or of chromogenic dyes, as in typical photographic color prints.

In the original version of the printing process, carbon tissue (a temporary support sheet coated with a layer of gelatin mixed with a pigment—originally carbon black, from which the name derives) is bathed in a potassium dichromate sensitizing solution, dried, then exposed to strong ultraviolet light through a photographic negative, hardening the gelatin in proportion to the amount of light reaching it. The tissue is then developed by treatment with warm water, which dissolves the unhardened gelatin. The resulting pigment image is physically transferred to a final support surface, either directly or indirectly. In an important early 20th century variation of the process, known as carbro (carbon-bromide) printing, contact with a conventional silver bromide paper print, rather than exposure to light, was used to selectively harden the gelatin. A wide variety of colored pigments can be used instead of carbon black.

The process can produce images of very high quality which are exceptionally resistant to fading and other deterioration. It was developed in the mid-19th century in response to concerns about the fading of early types of silver-based black-and-white prints, which was already becoming apparent within a relatively few years of their introduction.

The most recent development in the process was made by the American photographer Charles Berger in 1993 with the introduction of a non-toxic sensitizer that presented none of the health and safety hazards of the toxic (now EU-restricted) dichromate sensitizer.

Carbon tissue
Carbon tissue, a layer of unsensitized pigmented gelatin on a thin paper support sheet, was introduced by British physicist and chemist Joseph Swan in 1864. Marketing began in 1866. Initially, his ready-made tissues were sold in only three colors: black, sepia and purple-brown. Eventually, a wide array of hues became available. Carbon tissue was a stock item in Europe and the US well into the 20th century, but by the 1950s carbon printing was very rare and supplies for it became an exotic specialty item. Some companies produced small quantities of carbon tissue and transfer papers for monochrome and three-color work until around 1990.

Overview and history of carbon printing

The carbon process, initially a black-and-white process using lampblack (carbon black), was invented by Alphonse Poitevin in 1855. The process was later adapted to color, through the use of pigments, by Louis Ducos du Hauron in 1868. Carbon printing remained commercially popular through the first half of the 20th century. It was replaced over time by the dye-transfer process, chromogenic, dye-bleach (or dye destruction, i.e. Cibachrome) and, now, digital printing processes. The efficiencies gained through these more modern automated processes relegated carbon printing to the commercial backwaters in the latter half of the 20th century. It is now only found in the darkrooms of the rare enthusiast and a few exotic labs.

Carbon printing is based on the fact that gelatin, when sensitized to light by a dichromate, is hardened and made insoluble in water when exposed to ultraviolet light. Because of the comparative insensitivity of the material, sunlight or another strong source of UV light is normally used to minimize the required exposure time. To make a full-color print, three negatives photographed through red, green and blue filters are printed on dichromate-sensitized sheets of pigmented gelatin (traditionally called "carbon tissue" regardless of the pigment incorporated) containing, respectively, cyan, magenta and yellow pigments. They are developed in warm water, which dissolves the unhardened gelatin, leaving a colored relief image that is thickest where it received the strongest exposure. The three images are then transferred, one at a time, onto a final support such as a heavy sheet of smooth gelatin-sized paper. Usually, the yellow image is transferred first, then the magenta image is applied on top of it, great care being taken to superimpose it in exact register, and then the cyan image is similarly applied. A fourth black pigment "key" layer is sometimes added, as in mechanical printing processes, to improve edge definition and mask any spurious color cast in the dark areas of the image, but it is not a traditional component.

The resulting finished print, whether composed of several layers and in full color or having only a single monochrome layer, exhibits a very slight bas-relief effect and a variation of texture on its surface, both distinctive characteristics of a carbon print. The process is time-consuming and labor-intensive. Each color carbon print requires three, or four, round trips in the darkroom to create the finished print. An individual, using existing pigmented sheets and separations, can prepare, print and process enough material, 60 sheets including the support, to produce about twelve 20" x 24" four-color prints in a 40-hour work week. However, this investment of time and effort can create prints of outstanding visual quality and proven archival permanence.

The carbon process can be used to produce:
Monochrome prints, usually black-and-white, but they may be sepia, cyan or any other preferred color.
Duochrome (duotone) prints, an effect many printers are familiar with, using complementary or associated colors to their best effect.
Trichrome prints, traditional full-color prints made by layering YMC (yellow, magenta and cyan) pigment sheets.
Quadrachrome prints, essentially full-color trichrome prints with an added black K (key) layer to increase density and mask any spurious color in dark areas.
Any combination of layers, in any color, is possible to achieve whatever ends the printer desires.
There are two primary techniques used in carbon printing: single transfer and double transfer. This has to do with the negatives (separations) being right- or wrong-reading and the image "flopping" during the transfer process.

Because the carbon printing process uses pigments instead of dyes, it is capable of producing a far more archivally stable (permanent) print than any of the other color processes. Good examples of the color stability of pigments can be found in the paintings of the great masters, the true colors of which, in many cases, have survived all these centuries. A more contemporary example of the color stability of pigments is found in the paints used on automobiles today, which must survive intense daily exposure to very harsh lighting, under extreme conditions. The useful life of many (but not all) pigment formulations has been projected out to be several centuries and beyond (perhaps millennia, if cave paintings of Lascaux, the wall paintings in the tombs of the Valley of the Kings and the frescoes of Pompeii are relevant examples), often being limited only to the useful life of the particular support used. Additionally, the use of pigment also produces a wider color gamut than any of the other color processes, allowing for a greater range and subtlety of color reproduction.

Though carbon printing always has been, and remains, a labor-intensive, time-consuming and technologically demanding process, there are still those that prefer the high aesthetic of its remarkable beauty and longevity over all other processes.

Chronological History of Carbon (Pigment) Printing

Artists known for carbon prints
 Julia Margaret Cameron
 Rudolf Koppitz
 Nickolas Muray (carbro process)
 Rene Pauli
 Franck RONDOT Diazidostilbene (DAS) Carbon prints

See also
 Laser printing, which uses carbon pigment fused with styrene binder, imaged with optical and digital technology
 Oil print process, another process based on hardened gelatin
 Woodburytype, a variation of the carbon process

References

External links

 Carbon. Report on the carbon process from the Getty Conservation Institute
 Description of the carbon process
 Carbon process methods and materials
 Description of the charcoal process
 Theory of the carbon process, including discussion of the carbro (carbon-bromine) process
 Making a Carbon Transfer Print, a video showing a modern workflow
 Diazidostilbene (DAS) Carbon transfer printing from pigment to printing

Photographic processes dating from the 19th century
Non-impact printing